Ashot Arakelovich Sarkisov (30 January 1924 – 17 October 2022) was a Russian scientist who worked with nuclear submarine technology, nuclear safety and decommissioning of nuclear facilities.

Early years
Ashot Sarkisov was born to an Armenian father, Arakel Ovanesovich Sarkisov (1881–1959), and a Russian mother, Evgenia Bogdanovna (1896–1987).

Career 
Sarkisov entered the Felix Dzerzhinsky Higher Naval Engineering School in 1941, then served in the army during the war and resumed his studies in 1945. From 1948, he also studied at the Leningrad State University. He became Doctor of Technology in 1968. Since 1994, he has been a full member of the Russian Academy of Sciences, and he received its Aleksandrov Gold Medal in 2007. Sarkisov retired from the navy as vice admiral.

One of his research interests has been dynamic nuclear power generation processes in marine applications, particularly the effects of severe impacts. Sarkisov has also worked with the decommissioning of nuclear facilities in Northwestern Russia, for which he was awarded the Global Energy Prize in 2014, along with Lars Gunnar Larsson.

Personal life and death
Sarkisov died in Moscow on the morning of 17 October 2022, at the age of 98.

References 

1924 births
2022 deaths
Russian nuclear physicists
Russian people of Armenian descent
Corresponding Members of the USSR Academy of Sciences
Full Members of the Russian Academy of Sciences
Military personnel from Tashkent
Saint Petersburg State University alumni
Soviet vice admirals
Soviet military personnel of World War II
Engineers from Tashkent
Recipients of the Order "For Merit to the Fatherland", 2nd class
Recipients of the Order "For Merit to the Fatherland", 3rd class
Recipients of the Order "For Merit to the Fatherland", 4th class
Recipients of the Order of Honour (Russia)
Recipients of the Order of the Red Star
Recipients of the Order "For Service to the Homeland in the Armed Forces of the USSR", 3rd class
Recipients of the Medal of Zhukov